Sir Stephen Huw Powis is national medical director for England, in the National Health Service (NHS), appointed at the start of 2018 to succeed Sir Bruce Keogh. He is also a professor of renal medicine at University College London.

Family and education 
His father was a chaplain at the Christie Hospital, Manchester.

Powis studied medicine at Glasgow University and St John's College, Oxford, matriculating in 1979.  He obtained a PhD while working at the Imperial Cancer Research Fund. He also holds an MBA from Warwick University.

Professional career 
Powis joined the Royal Free London NHS Foundation Trust in 1997 as a consultant, becoming the trust's medical director in 2006 and chief clinical information officer in 2016. He left the Royal Free at the end of 2017 to become medical director of NHS England, a post he took up at the beginning of 2018. During this time, Powis was involved in a partnership for the Royal Free to share information with Google Deepmind. His main clinical interest is renal transplantation.

He is a past non-executive director of North Middlesex University Hospital NHS Trust (including a period of eight months as acting chairman), chair of the Association of UK Hospitals medical directors' group, and chairman of the Joint Royal Colleges of Physicians Training Board speciality advisory committee for renal medicine. He sat on the board of Medical Education England.

He edited Nephron Clinical Practice from 2003 to 2008 and was inaugural editor-in-chief of the BMJ Leader from 2017.

During the COVID-19 pandemic, which began in the spring of 2020, he frequently spoke as part of the government's team for daily briefings.

In 2021 he was appointed as interim chief executive officer of NHS Improvement.

He was created a Knight Bachelor, for services to the NHS, particularly during Covid-19, in the Queen's 2022 Birthday Honours.

References

External links

Video of Powis speaking on YouTube

National Health Service people
Living people
Year of birth missing (living people)
Place of birth missing (living people)
Physicians of the Royal Free Hospital
Academics of University College London
British nephrologists
Alumni of St John's College, Oxford
Knights Bachelor